Frog Pocket is the recording name of John Charles Wilson, a Scottish musician. He is currently signed to Mike Paradinas' record label Planet Mu. He also runs his own record label, Mouthmoth. Wilson mixes elements of folk with electronica and often uses fast, noisy and complicated beats in his songs. His songs usually incorporate violin and guitar (often using harmonics).

Notable releases

Full length albums

EPs

Compilations

Guest Appearances

References

External links 
 Frog Pocket - "Frog and the Volcano!" on Bandcamp
 Frog Pocket official website
 Discography at Discogs
 Artist page at Planet Mu

Scottish electronic musicians
Living people
Year of birth missing (living people)
Planet Mu artists